Sharif "Reefa" Slater is a music producer who has produced for notable artists. He was raised in Brownsville, Brooklyn, and currently heads a production company for emerging artists and producers.

Production work/involvement
Sharif "Reefa" Slater has produced for Lil Wayne, Estelle, The Game, Rick Ross, Troy Ave, Maino, Fabolous, Ludacris, Juelz Santana, French Montana, Gucci Mane, Omarion, Beanie Sigel, Red Cafe, Super Junior and The Notorious B.I.G. One of his most successful singles to date has been "It's Okay (One Blood)" by The Game, and he has been a producer on the two Billboard #1 albums released by Miami Rapper, Rick Ross, namely "God Forgives, I Don't", and "Mastermind."

Early career
Hailing from Brownsville, Brooklyn, he became interested in music - one of his uncles lived on the same block as Biggie Smalls, and he saw first hand how producers like Diddy and The Trackmasters translated their studio skills into lucrative careers. He began discjockeying at local reggae parties, and moved on to producing rap instrumentals. His first beat placement was for rapper Shells  – on a song that was included on the Coach Carter film soundtrack.

Almost two years passed after he sold that track without anything really happening in his career. Things eventually got moving again through Puffy's Biggie Duets project. He produced the "Hustler's Story" song featuring Akon and Scarface, and Diddy immediately noticed he had a prize pupil on his hands. After that, the work started rolling in, and Reefa could finally start calling himself a bona fide producer. 
The real breakthrough in his career  came via Dr. Dre's legendary West coast outfit. During a brief visit to LA, he happened to play the "One Blood" instrumental for Aftermath A&R, Angelo Sanders. Hours later, he got a call informing him he'd scored the first single to The Game's highly anticipated sophomore album.

Recent activity: late 2000s to present
Over the last five years, Reefa has clocked heavy studio time with the new titans on the hip hop scene - French Montana, Troy Ave, Chinx Drugz, Maino and the reigning hip hop heavyweight, Rick Ross. Recently, he produced three cuts of French Montana's 2013 Excuse My French album released via Puff Daddy's Bad Boy label. He also crafted critically lauded tracks for the last two Rick Ross albums, God Forgives I Don't (released in 2012) and Mastermind (released in early 2014). Both Rick Ross albums debuted at #1 on the Billboard 200 Charts.  The track he produced for Rick Ross's 2012 album was a soulful, percussion-heavy banger called "Ice Cold" featuring R&B star Omarion. His contribution to Ross's most recent LP was a gritty, hard-hitting NYC-style track called "What A Shame" featuring French Montana.

In 2014, Reefa enjoyed great success on the Billboard top 200 Chart. He notched production credits on two albums that debuted in the Billboard Top 10 in the same week. The first was the aforementioned Mastermind album by Rick Ross, and the second was the comeback album Braveheart from R&B princess Ashanti. Both albums were released on March 4, 2014. Still to come in 2014, Reefa co-produced with Irv Gotti, Myles William and 12Keyz, a remake of the Notorious B.I.G. song "Mo Money Mo Problems" for "The Other Woman" soundtrack movie starring Cameron Diaz, Kate Upton and Nicki Minaj. The song features vocals by both Iggy Azalea and Keyshia Cole. In addition to that, he also secured the impressive job of scoring all the music for the upcoming season of T.I.'s VH1 reality show T.I. & Tiny: The Family Hustle."

Reefa Past Production Company: ATM (Addicted to Money)
Similar to prolific music production houses like Berry Gordy's Motown and Puff Daddy's hugely successful Hitmen, Reefa is looking to make a lasting impact with his company ATM. The production label was founded in 2005 by super-producer Sharif "Reefa" Slater. ATM currently houses upcoming hitmakers 12Keyz, Paul Ruess, TeddyDaDon and DiosMoreno. To date, the legion of exceptional musicians has created beats for artists like Estelle and Keyshia Cole. ATM also has a secret weapon under their wings – an amazing young vocalist named Jaymond Watkins. This budding star has already appeared on The Ellen De Generes show (at the age of just 11 years), and the YouTube video of that performance has garnered more than 4 million views ". Her album, executive produced by ATM, will drop this May. 
In the coming years, ATM is looking to become a household name in the music industry.

Awards and nominations

Grammy Awards 
The Grammy Awards are awarded annually by the National Academy of Recording Arts and Sciences.

Production Discography

 Lola Brooke - “Gator Season” (2022)
 Lola Brooke - “Here I Come” (2022)
 Lola Brooke - “Back To Business” (2020)
 Lola Brooke - “My Bop” (2020)
 Lola Brooke - “Shittin Me” (2019)
 Lola Brooke - “Options” (2019)
 Lobby Boyz Ft Benny the Butcher “Praying” (2022)
 French Montana Ft Fivio Foreign “Panicking” (2021)
 Symba - “Reality Is” (2021)
 Symba Ft Moneybagg Yo x O.T. Genasis x Too $hort x Justinlaboy - “Follow Me” (2021)
 JustinLaboy "Respectfully" (2021)
 Stunna Girl Ft 42 Dugg "Ratch" (2021) 
 Stunna Girl "Rotation" (2020)
 Stunna Girl "Like I Said Tho" (2021)
 Stunna Girl "Still Smoke" (2021)
 Stunna Girl "Cant Choose" (2021)
 Stunna Girl "Stunna This Stunna That" (2021)
 Lil Wayne - "Let It All Work Out" (2018)
 Lil Wayne - "Murda" ft  Junior Reid x Cory Gunz x Capo (2021)
 Estelle Ft Alicai Harley - "Slow Down" (2018)
 Estelle Ft Hood Celebrity - "Karma" (2018) - co-produced by 12Keyz
 Jay Watts - "Single Friends" (2017) - co-produced by 12Keyz
 Lenny Grant AKA Uncle Murda Ft 50 Cent x Jeremih - "On & On" (2017) - co-produced by 12Keyz
 PnB Rock Ft Ty Dolla Sign - "Hanging Up My Jersey" (2017) - co-produced by 12Keyz
 Uncle Murda - "Rap Up 2016" -co-produced by Teddy Da Don
 Uncle Murda Ft Young M.A x Dios Moreno - "Thot" (2016)
 Alessia Cara - "I'm Yours"  Original Version (2016) - co-produced by 12Keyz
 Manolo Rose - "Wallahi" (2016) 
 Jay Watts - "Thats Not Me" (2016) - co-produced by 12Keyz x Myles William x Adrian Melendez
 Jay Watts - "IDGAF" (2016) - co-produced by 12Keyz x Paul Ruess
 Uncle Murda - "Rap Up" (2015)
 Jay Watts - "How You Feel" - co-produced by 12Keyz x Paul Ruess
 Lil Wayne Ft Cory Gunz x Capo - "Murda" Free Weezy Album- (2015) co-produced by Myles William x 12Keyz
 Uncle Murda x Young Greatness musician - "Real Is Back" - (2015) co-produced by Myles William x JayAreOnTheBeat
 Estelle musician - "She Will Love" - (2015)
 Estelle musician - "Not Sure" - (2015) co-produced by 12Keyz x Myles William
 Estelle musician - "Conqueror" - (2015) co-produced by Johnny Black
 Rayven Justice "Dont Trust Em" ft Chinx x Uncle Murda - (2015) co-produced by 12Keyz
 Rayven Justice "Nobody" - (2015) co-produced by Myles William
 Maino X Mack Wilds - "All About You" (2014) co-produced by 12Keyz
 Maino K.O.B King Of Brooklyn Album (2013) ("K.O.B (Rules To This Shit) 
 Maino K.O.B King Of Brooklyn Album (2013) "Plottin"
 Maino K.O.B King Of Brooklyn Album (2013) "Bang"
 Maino K.O.B King Of Brooklyn Album (2013) "Great"
 Maino K.O.B King Of Brooklyn Album (2013) "Just Watch"
 The Other Woman - Movie Soundtrack (2014) "I'm Coming Out" featuring Keyshia Cole & Iggy Azalea - co-produced by Irv Gotti, Myles William and 12Keyz
 Rick Ross - Mastermind (2014) (09. "What A Shame" featuring French Montana - co produced by Stats)
 Ashanti - Braveheart (2014) (02. "Nowhere" co-produced by 12Keyz, 03. "Runaway" co-produced by 12Keyz)
 French Montana - Excuse My French (2013) (01. "Once In A While" co-produced by 12Keyz, 12. "We Go Wherever We Want" co-produced by 12Keyz, Vinylz and Allen Ritter, 19. "If I Die" co-produced by 12Keyz)
 Troy Ave - New York City - The Album (2013) 17. "I'm Dat N#gga" co-produced by Myles William and Stats
 Chinx - Arm & Dangerous" -  (2013) Co-produced by Myles William
 Ky-mani Marley - Love Over All" -  (2015)
 Ja Rule - Fresh Out Da Pen" -  (2013) co-produced by Myles William, 12Keyz and Irv Gotti
 Ja Rule - Everything" -  (2013) co-produced by Myles William and Irv Gotti
 Rick Ross - God Forgives, I Don't (2012) 12. "Ice Cold" featuring Omarion
 Styles P - Master of Ceremonies (2011) 11. "Don't Turn Away" Featuring Pharrell
 Super Junior - "Walkin" (2011) Fifth Studio Album
 Red Cafe - (2009) "Hottest in the Hood"
 Red Cafe - (2006) "Diddy Bop"
 Red Cafe - (2005) "Bling Blaouw"
 Willy Northpole - "Tha Connect" (2009)
 Willy Northpole - "The Story" (2009)
 Willy Northpole - "Dear Lord" (2009)
 Fabolous - From Nothin' to Something (2007) 
 Fabolous "Gangsta Don't Play" featuring Junior Reid(2007) 
 Fabolous "I'm The Man" featuring Red Cafe (2007)
 Gucci Mane - Back To The Trap House (2007) 02. "16 Fever"
 Beanie Sigel - "Gutted" Featuring Jay Z (2007)
 Beanie Sigel -  "Creep Low" (2007)
 Beanie Sigel - "The Bridge" Featuring Scarface x Raheem DeVaughn (2007)
 The Game - Doctor's Advocate (2006) 03. "It's Okay (One Blood" featuring Junior Reid
 Juelz Santana - What the Game's Been Missing (2005) 18. "I Am Crack"
 The Notorious B.I.G. - Duets: The Final Chapter (2005) 14. "Hustler's Story" featuring Scarface & Akon
 Benzino Ft 2Pac & Freddie Foxxx “Trying To Make It Through” (2005) Archnemsis
 Capone - Pain, Time and Glory (2005) 14. "F*#k Yo Set"
 Coach Carter - Movie Soundtrack (2005) "Why I Love You" performed by Shells
 Fabolous "Do the Damn Thing" featuring Jeezy (2004)
 Fabolous "Holla at Somebody Real" featuring Lil Mo (2004)

References

Living people
African-American record producers
Record producers from New York (state)
Hip hop record producers
1983 births
People from Brownsville, Brooklyn
21st-century African-American people
20th-century African-American people